Luiz is a Portuguese given name that is an alternative form of Luís. It's archaic in Portugal, but common in Brazil. Notable people referred to by this name include the following:

People
Luiz Bonfá (1922-2001), Brazilian guitarist and composer
Luiz Alfredo Garcia-Roza (1936-2020), Brazilian professor and novelist
Luiz Inácio Lula da Silva (born 1945), Brazilian politician and 35th president of Brazil
Luiz Felipe Scolari (born 1948), Brazilian football manager and former defender
Luiz Alberto Figueiredo (born 1955), Brazilian diplomat
Luiz Alberto da Silva Oliveira (born 1977), Brazilian football centre-back
Luiz Alberto (born 1982), Brazilian football centre-back
Luíz Carlos (born 1985), Brazilian football defensive midfielder
David Luiz (born 1987), Brazilian football centre-back
Luiz Gustavo (born 1987), Brazilian football defensive midfielder
Luiz Alberto de Araújo (born 1987), Brazilian decathlete
Luiz Adriano (born 1987), Brazilian football striker
Luiz Phellype (born 1993), Brazilian football forward
Luiz Altamir Melo (born 1996), Brazilian swimmer
Luiz A. Rocha, Brazilian ichthyologist
Douglas Luiz (born 1988), Brazilian football midfielder
Luiz (footballer, born 1982), Luiz Renato Viana da Silva, Brazilian football forward
Luiz (footballer, born 1983), Luiz Silva Filho, Brazilian football goalkeeper

See also

Luis

Notes

Portuguese masculine given names